Oskar Wahlström (born 16 August 1976) is a Swedish former football goalkeeper. He most recently played  for Djurgårdens IF after retiring after the 2009 season. Wahlström joined Djurgården in 2004, leaving Västerås SK. He made his Allsvenskan debut against Landskrona BoIS on 2 May 2004 as a substitute. Wahlström has also represented Katrineholms SK and Bie GoIF.

Honours 
 Djurgårdens IF 
 Allsvenskan: 2005

References

External links

1976 births
Allsvenskan players
Djurgårdens IF Fotboll players
Västerås SK Fotboll players
Swedish footballers
Living people
Association football goalkeepers